Blane Smith (born July 13, 1954) is a former linebacker in the National Football League (NFL). He was drafted in the seventh round of the 1977 NFL Draft by the Cleveland Browns and was a member of the Green Bay Packers that season. After his NFL career he went to work for Inland Steel as a sales rep. He was captain of his college football team at Purdue University. How now lives in Detroit and is CEO of Blane Smith and Associates. He has two sons, Blane and Blake.

References

1954 births
Living people
American football linebackers
Green Bay Packers players
Purdue Boilermakers football players
Players of American football from Gary, Indiana